A Lifelong Journey is a period drama that will be released in mainland China in 2022. It is adapted from Liang Xiaosheng's novel "A Lifelong Journey". Director Li Lu, starring Lei Jiayin, Xin Baiqing, Song Jia, Yin Tao.  It will be broadcast on CCTV One and iQiyi on January 28, 2022, It will be broadcast on Jiangsu Satellite TV on February 24. Radio Television Hong Kong purchased the broadcasting rights in Hong Kong in 2022, and it will be broadcast on RTHK TV 31 "Weekend National Drama Theater". On February 18, the lead actor Sarina revealed in an interview with the media that Disney has purchased the global copyright of the play. The show is expected to be broadcast outside mainland China through Disney+.

Story
The play tells the story of three generations of a family surnamed Zhou in a provincial capital city in Northeast China working hard to create a better life from the late period of Cultural Revolution to after Reform and Opening Up.

Actor

Broadcast time

Track

Evaluation
The average ratings of this drama ranks first in the same period of TV dramas on all star channels, Attracting 310 million people to watch the drama, it has received a lot of praise and has become a hit at the beginning of the year.

References

2022 Chinese television series debuts
Television shows based on Chinese novels
IQIYI original programming
IQIYI